State Route 423 (SR 423) is a  long north–south state highway in the central portion of the U.S. state of Ohio.  The southern terminus of  SR 423 is in Waldo at a T-intersection that also serves as the eastern terminus of SR 47, as well as the southern terminus of SR 98.  The signed northern terminus
However, SR 423 is defined to continue northeast from this point along SR 231 for about  before coming to an end at the U.S. Route 23 (US 23) expressway.

In Marion, SR 423 and SR 4 form a concurrency and split into two one-way pairs. Northbound SR 4/423 travels on State Street while southbound SR 4/423 (officially designated SR 4-D and SR 423-D) travel on Prospect Street.

History
The route that SR 423 currently takes was signed in 1923 as SR 4, between Waldo and Marion and SR 22 north of Marion. The entire highway became US 23 in 1926. The route number was originally designated for a planned bypass around Portsmouth in the 1960s (now designated as Ohio State Route 823). Between 1967 and 1969, US 23 was moved onto a new four-lane highway and the old route of US 23 became SR 423.

Major intersections

References

External links

State Route 423 Endpoint Photos

423
Transportation in Marion County, Ohio
U.S. Route 23